Anthony Taylor may refer to:

 Anthony Taylor (Medal of Honor) (1837–1894), Medal of Honor recipient in the American Civil War
 Albert Taylor (diver) (1882–1932), British diver
 Anthony Taylor (bishop) (born 1954), American Roman Catholic bishop
 Anthony Taylor (basketball) (born 1965), American professional basketball player
 Anthony Taylor (referee) (born 1978), English football referee
 Anthony Hollis Taylor (1942–2019), American engineer and navigator of space probes at JPL

See also 
 285937 Anthonytaylor, asteroid
 Tony Taylor (disambiguation)